ATP Esercizio Srl was an Italian public transport company operating in 67 small cities near Genoa, Italy. The major shareholder of the company is the Province of Genova (66,16%). The company operates under its owner ATP Azienda Trasporti Provinciali Spa.

History
ATP Esercizio Srl was founded in the beginning of 2012 by the merging of two transport companies: Tigullio Pubblici Trasporti Spa, founded in 1976 and operating in Chiavari, and ALI Autolinee Liguri Provincia di Genova Spa, founded on 2 June 2000.

On the 1st January 2021, ATP Esercizio effectively merged into AMT Genova in its entirety; with its services and staff now being part of the latter operator.

References

Companies based in Genoa
Transport companies established in 1976
Transport companies of Italy